The Kelso River is a  stream in northern Minnesota, the United States. It flows entirely within the Boundary Waters Canoe Area Wilderness of Superior National Forest, ending at Sawbill Lake. Water from the Kelso River flows via Sawbill Creek (the outlet of Sawbill Lake) to the Temperance River and thence to Lake Superior.

See also
List of rivers of Minnesota

References

Minnesota Watersheds
USGS Hydrologic Unit Map - State of Minnesota (1974)

Rivers of Cook County, Minnesota
Tributaries of Lake Superior